The Sheriffs (Scotland) Act 1747 (21 Geo.II c.19) was an Act of the Parliament of Great Britain which applied only to Scotland. It stated that anyone who was prosecuted on or after 1 April 1748 for treason or misprision of treason could be tried anywhere in Scotland if the crime had been committed in any of the shires of Dunbartain, Stirling, Perth, Kincardine, Aberdeen, Inverness, Nairn, Cromarty, Argyll, Forfarshire, Banff, Sutherland, Caithness, Elgine, Ross, and Orkney. Normally a crime had to be tried in the shire where it had been committed. The Act also said that in such a trial, the jurors could come from adjoining counties, instead of (as would otherwise be the case) the county where the trial was held.

It also provided that His Majesty's Advocate could move the trial to the High Court of Justiciary, and that peers had the right to be tried by their peers. These provisions expired after seven years, but were later revived again for another seven years in 1760 by another Act, 33 Geo.II c.26.

The act also began the process of grouping the smaller shires into a single sheriffdom, by creating shared sheriffdoms for:
Fife and Kinross
Stirling and Clackmannan
Argyll and Bute
Elgin and Nairn
Sutherland and Caithness
Ross and Cromarty

Notes

References
The Scots Statutes Revised. W Green and Sons. 1899. Volume 1. Page 80.
The Public General Statutes Affecting Scotland. William Blackwood and Sons. Edinburgh. 1876. Volume 1. Pages 121 and 122.
Statutes at Large, vol. XIX, Danby Pickering, Cambridge University Press, 1765.
Walker. A Legal History of Scotland. W Green. 1988. Volume 6. Pages 356 and 454. 2004. Volume 7. Page 633.
Robson and Rodger. The Spaces of Justice: The Architecture of the Scottish Court. Farleigh Dickinson University Press. Rowman & Littlefield Publishing Group. 2018. Pages 34 and 36.

See also
Treason Act
Jurors (Scotland) Act 1745

Great Britain Acts of Parliament 1747
Treason in Scotland
Acts of the Parliament of Great Britain concerning Scotland
1747 in Scotland
Scottish criminal law
Jacobite rising of 1745
Jurisdiction